The 1948 United States presidential election in West Virginia took place on November 2, 1948, as part of the 1948 United States presidential election. West Virginia voters chose eight representatives, or electors, to the Electoral College, who voted for president and vice president.

West Virginia was won by incumbent President Harry S. Truman (D–Missouri), running with Kentucky Senator Alben W. Barkley, with 57.32 percent of the popular vote, against Governor Thomas Dewey (R–New York), running with Governor Earl Warren, with 42.24 percent of the popular vote.

Results

Results by county

References

West Virginia
1948
1948 West Virginia elections